Peshawar is the capital of the Khyber Pakhtunkhwa province of Pakistan. 

Peshawar may also refer to:

 Peshawar, Afghanistan, a village
 Peshawar (district), Khyber Pakhtunkhwa, Pakistan
 Peshawar Cantonment, in Peshawar city, Khyber Pakhtunkhwa, Pakistan
 Peshawar (series), a 2020 Indian web series by Ullu
 Peshawar Zalmi, a Pakistani cricket franchise
 Peshawar cricket team
 Abdur Rehman Peshawari (1886–1925), Turkish soldier, journalist and diplomat

See also
 
 
 Peshawari (disambiguation)
 Pesawur, a village in Afghanistan